Cambie Street is a street in Vancouver, British Columbia, Canada.  It is named for Henry John Cambie, chief surveyor of the Canadian Pacific Railway's western division (as is Cambie Road, a major thoroughfare in nearby Richmond).

There are two distinct sections of the street. North of False Creek, the street runs on a northeast-southwest alignment (following the rotated street grid within Downtown Vancouver). As such, the street direction is approximately 45 degrees to that of the Cambie Bridge, and there is no seamless connection between the two. Instead, Nelson Street carries southbound traffic onto the bridge, and Smithe Street carries northbound traffic away from the bridge. The downtown section of Cambie Street runs from Water Street in Gastown in the north to Pacific Boulevard in Yaletown in the south and is a two-way street for its length.

South of False Creek, the street is a major six-lane arterial road, and runs as a two-way north-south thoroughfare according to the street grid for the rest of Vancouver. This section of the street was originally named Bridge Street, and was first connected to Cambie Street after the first Cambie Bridge opened in 1891; it was renamed Cambie Street after the second Cambie Bridge opened in 1912.

Between King Edward Avenue West and Southwest Marine Drive, the street has a 10 metre wide boulevard with grass and many well established trees on it; the boulevard was designated as a heritage landscape by the city of Vancouver in 1993.

Canada Line construction

When proposals to build SkyTrain's Canada Line (formerly known as the Richmond-Airport-Vancouver or RAV Line) along Cambie Street first emerged, they were heavily protested by residents and business owners who wanted to keep the street as a heritage boulevard. They argued in favour of using the existing Arbutus Street rail corridor instead.

Once the decision was made to use the Cambie alignment for the Canada Line anyway, residents along the corridor successfully persuaded authorities to put the rail line in a tunnel instead of running it as a surface route, and to dig the tunnel using a tunnel boring machine. However, due to cost concerns and time constraints, the winning bidder decided to use a cut-and-cover method to build the tunnel – which required disruption to traffic and business along the corridor during the construction. As such, even though it cost less and was much faster than using a tunnel boring machine, the plan drew heavy criticism from area residents and businesses.

During 2006 to 2009, portions of the street south of False Creek were closed to traffic to allow for construction of the line. The cut-and-cover tunnel runs underneath the east side of the street for most of its route. South of West 63rd Avenue, the line emerges from the tunnel and runs on an elevated structure across the Fraser River.

Gregor Robertson, who later became the mayor of Vancouver, was a strong supporter of Cambie Street merchants and spoke regularly about hardships from the Canada Line construction.  He called the handling of the rail line construction an "injustice."

On March 23, 2009, Robertson testified in a lawsuit brought by Cambie Street merchant Susan Heyes, owner of Hazel & Co., in the B.C. Supreme Court regarding damage to her business from the construction, a lawsuit for which she was awarded $600,000 by the B.C. Supreme Court due in part to the fact that there was insufficient action to mitigate the effects of Canada Line construction on Cambie Street merchants. The award for damages was later reversed at the British Columbia Court of Appeal, which determined that while the project had resulted in a legal nuisance to the claimant, the government had acted within its authority and was therefore not liable for damages. Leave for further appeal to the Supreme Court of Canada was subsequently denied. On the Canada Line's opening day of August 17, 2009, Robertson said Greater Vancouver needed more rapid transit but the Canada Line was a "great start" and that he was a "Johnny-come-lately" to the project.

Points of interest

 The Gastown steam clock, located at the street's northern end, at its intersection with Water Street
 Victory Square and cenotaph, located on the west side of the street between Hastings and Pender streets
 The downtown campus of Vancouver Community College, located at the intersection with Pender Street
 The Vancouver City Hall, located on the street between 10th Avenue and 12th Avenue
 The Park Theatre, at 18th Avenue, in "Cambie Village"
 Queen Elizabeth Park, located east of the street between 29th Avenue and 37th Avenue
 Oakridge Centre, shopping centre at 41st Avenue
 Langara College, a community college at 49th Avenue
 St. John Ambulance, Provincial Headquarters for one of BC's oldest charities

Major intersections

Main section

Downtown section

See also
Cambie Street Grounds (Larwill Park)
Cambie Seymour Hostel

External links
Cambie Street Directory
GVTV Cambie Boulevard (WMV)
Cambie Village Business Association

References

Streets in Vancouver